Nectandra cerifolia is a species of plant in the family Lauraceae. It is endemic to Ecuador.  Its natural habitat is subtropical or tropical moist montane forests.

References

cerifolia
Endemic flora of Ecuador
Endangered flora of South America
Taxonomy articles created by Polbot